Rhythm Crazy is an album led by American trombonist Jimmy Cleveland. It features tracks recorded in 1959, but the LP was not released by the EmArcy label until 1964.

Reception

The Allmusic review stated: "Long out of print, this Emarcy LP is long overdue to be reissued on CD".

Track listing
 "Crazy Rhythm" (Irving Caesar, Roger Wolfe Kahn, Joseph Meyer) - 3:55
 "Old Reliable" (Oscar Pettiford) - 4:16
 "We Never Kissed" (Melba Liston) - 3:46 	
 "Tom-Kattin'" (Lucky Thompson) - 3:33 	
 "Our Delight" (Tadd Dameron) - 4:30
 "Reminiscing" (Gigi Gryce) - 3:02
 "Tricotism" (Pettiford) - 7:59

Personnel 
Jimmy Cleveland - trombone
Art Farmer - trumpet
Jerome Richardson - flute, tenor saxophone, baritone saxophone 
Benny Golson - tenor saxophone, arranger
Hank Jones - piano
Milt Hinton - bass
Osie Johnson - drums
Gigi Gryce - arranger

References 

1964 albums
Jimmy Cleveland albums
EmArcy Records albums
Albums arranged by Benny Golson